"Save Me" is a song by Dave Dee, Dozy, Beaky, Mick & Tich, released as a single in December 1966. It peaked at number 3 on the UK Singles Chart.

Reception 
Reviewing for New Musical Express, Derek Johnson wrote that the band "certainly believe in ringing the changes. This time they've abandoned the Bend in favour of an up-tempo, almost breathtaking, exotic Latin rhythm. It's a sort of bossa rumba, with a touch of Afro-Cuban thrown in for good measure". Reviewed in Record Mirror, it was described as "a powerful up-tempo belter, marked by clever drumming and piercingly exciting falsetto vocal work".

Track listing 
 "Save Me" – 2:58
 "Shame" – 2:05

Charts

References 

1966 singles
1966 songs
Fontana Records singles
Songs written by Alan Blaikley
Songs written by Ken Howard (composer)
Song recordings produced by Steve Rowland